Barquisimeto is a city in Venezuela. Barquisimeto is located in the Central-Western Region, Venezuela. It is the capital of the state of Lara and head of Iribarren Municipality. It is an important urban, industrial, commercial and transportation center of the country, recognized as the fourth-largest city by population and area in Venezuela after Caracas, Maracaibo and Valencia.

History 

Barquisimeto was founded in 1552 by Juan de Villegas, as a headquarters and to have better control of the territory believed to be rich in gold. Its original name was Nueva Segovia de Barquisimeto and then it was shortened to just Barquisimeto.

This city had four settlements due to ignorance of the physical environment of the region. The first one was in 1552 nearby Buría River, but moved in 1556 due to frequent floods suffered by inhabitants. The second one was in the valley of the Turbio River where the city stayed until Lope de Aguirre burned it down in 1561. Its rebuilding was made , but in 1562 they asked for permission to move to another site due to strong winds blowing in the place. Finally, Barquisimeto was located on the north plateau of the Turbio River in 1563.

During the country's independence, Barquisimeto joined the liberation movement and its deputy José Ángel Álamo signed the Independence Act on July 5, 1811.

In 1929, the city went through a modernization program carried out by General Juan Vicente Gomez. He fixed the streets and avenues and buildings were built, like the Jacinto Lara Headquarters, the Government Palace and the Ayacucho Park.

Names and etymology 
According to the German adventurer Nikolaus Federmann, the Caquetío aborigines used to call it Variquicimeto, which translates as "ash-colored river", the name with which the natives distinguished the water stream near the city. This river was named "Turbio River" by the Spanish conquerors, a name that is still in use today. Another possible name origin is due to a red dye called bariquí.

When Juan de Villegas founded it, he named the city "Nueva Segovia de Barquisimeto", but years later it became just "Barquisimeto", a word popularized by Oviedo y Baños in his book History and Conquest of the Venezuelan Population.

Religion 

The city's modern Cathedral of Our Lady of Mount Carmel is the cathedral of the episcopal see of the Roman Catholic Archdiocese of Barquisimeto.

Divina Pastora 

The Divina Pastora (Divine Shepherdess) is a statue of the Virgin Mary holding the infant Jesus, with a lamb at her side. It is considered to be one of the most important religious icons of Venezuela. Divina Pastora is the patron saint of the city of Barquisimeto and of the Venezuelan National Militia. The original image dates from 1735. Divina Pastora is celebrated in a procession on January 14 of each year, when a massive Marian procession occurs, considered to be one of the largest in the world, attracting thousands of pilgrims.

The statue is removed from its shrine and is carried on the main streets of Barquisimeto in a procession which starts at the Iglesia de la Divina Pastora in Santa Rosa until it reaches the Barquisimeto Cathedral. This procession is unlike other mass Marian celebrations in the world, where the image does not leave its temple. This procession occurs due to the devotion the people of Barquisimeto have towards it as gratitude towards saving the city from a cholera outbreak that occurred in the city in the 19th century. In 2013, 3,000,000 faithful honored the Divina Pastora.

Geography 

It has a location on the central western of Venezuela ( from Caracas, the country's capital city), being a point of convergence of many of the major land routes and rail, characterized also by its street order and appropriate signage due to the location of the city with a relief almost completely flat, which facilitated the distribution of the urban grid and with the streets numbered in ascending numerical order, factors that help the foreign citizen and easily locate addresses. Its climate is pleasant in the months of December to March, with an average temperature of  throughout the year.

Neighboring municipalities 
 North: Urdaneta Municipality
 South: Palavecino Municipality
 East: Peña Municipality, Yaracuy State
 West: Jiménez and Torres Municipalities.

Large-magnitude earthquakes (Richter’s scale)
 6.6 (8/3/1950)
 5.6 (3/5/1975)
 6.3 (9/12/2009)

Climate 

In the city, a hot semi-arid climate (Köppen BSh) is dominant. Located in that region, Barquisimeto records  of rain per year and its average temperature ranges . However, in higher regions near the Andes, temperatures are lower and the rain is more constant.

Education 

Barquisimeto is a city with a historic vocation by academic knowledge, and boasts a considerable sample of universities and institutes of higher education in Venezuela, has a high and growing student population from all over the country.

Major universities in the city include Universidad Centroccidental Lisandro Alvarado and Universidad Nacional Experimental Politécnica Antonio José de Sucre.

Other universities and colleges
Public institutions
 Universidad Centroccidental Lisandro Alvarado ( UCLA)
 National Polytechnic Experimental University Antonio José de Sucre ( UNEXPO)
 Libertador's Experimental and Pedagogical University (UPEL)
 Andrés Eloy Blanco's Territorial and Polytechnic of Lara University (IUETAEB - former Andrés Eloy Blanco's Experimental and Technology Institute)
 National Open University (UNA)
 Simón Rodríguez's National Experimental University (UNESR)
 Central University of Venezuela (UCV - Barquisimeto's Regional Center)
 Bolivarian University of Venezuela (UBV)
 National Experimental University of the Armed Forces (UNEFA)

Private institutions
 Fermin Toro University (UFT)
 Yacambú University (UNY)
 Fermin Toro College (CUFT)
 Rodolfo Loero Arismendi Technology and Industrial Institute (IUTIRLA)
 National Institute of Socialist Education and Capacitation (INCES)
 Antonio José de Sucre Technology Institute (IUTAJS)
 Jesús Obrero Institute (IUJO)

Hospitals

Private hospitals
 Clínica IDB Barquisimeto
Address: Carrera 19 esquina calle 34

 Clínica Razetti de Barquisimeto
Address: Carrera 21

 Policlínica Barquisimeto
Address: Av. Lara (paseo Los Leones y calle Madrid)

 Previmédica IDB Los Abogados
Address: Av. Los Abogados (calles 16 y 17). 50 mts. from Av. Vargas

 Previmédica IDB Centro
Address: Calle 34 (carreras 19 y 20)

 Previmédica IDB Oeste
Address: Av. Pedro León Torres (calle 59). CC Sotavento

Public hospitals

 Hospital Central Universitario Antonio María Pineda
Address: Av. Libertador

Hospital Dr. Luis Gómez López
Address: Barrio La Feria

Gallery Images

Transportation 
The Transbarca system is a new "bus rapid transit" (BRT) system under construction, which was originally planned to use trolleybuses. When construction began, in 2006, the system was projected to serve an average of 170,000 people per day when completed, using 80 trolleybuses operating along  of exclusive lanes, across the metropolitan area. With 52 stations, the BRT system is to include  a centralized system of communication and security, and structures for easy access for elderly and disabled people. It is to be complemented with feeder routes, covering the areas of Greater Barquisimeto the BRT line will not serve, which will connect with the main line at terminal stations.

Although 80 articulated trolleybuses were purchased from Neoplan and delivered around 2008–09, the plans to operate the Transbarca system with those vehicles were dropped in 2013. In addition to reasons of cost, an inadequate supply of electricity with which to power the system was cited in the announcement of the decision.

 Buses are the main means of mass transportation. The system runs a variety of bus types, operated by several companies on normal streets and avenues:
 bus; large buses.
 buseta; medium-sized buses.
 microbus or colectivo; vans or minivans.
 rapiditos; old cars with capacity for 5 or more people.

The city has an airport called Jacinto Lara International Airport.

Sports 

The city is home to several notable baseball and football teams. Several other sports also have Barquisimeto as their home.
 Cardenales de Lara (Venezuelan Professional Baseball League)
Guaros de Lara (Venezuelan Professional Basketball League)
Lara FC (Venezuelan Professional Soccer League)

Notable people
 Rafael Cadenas - poet and essayist, winner of the Cervantes prize in 2022.
 Junior Alvarado - Thoroughbred racing jockey
 Gregorio Camacho - painter
 Pedro Carmona - economist who served briefly as acting president of Venezuela in 2002.
 Carlos Carrasco - Major League Baseball pitcher for the New York Mets
 Gabriel Coronel - actor
 Gustavo Dudamel - conductor
 Andrés Giménez - Major League Baseball player for the Cleveland Guardians
 Carlos Mendoza - Major League Baseball coach
 Amleto Monacelli - professional ten-pin bowler
 Dori Parra de Orellana (1923-2007) – politician
 Manny Piña - Major League Baseball player for the Atlanta Braves

See also 

 Venezuela
 Lara state
 List of cities in Venezuela
 List of wine-producing regions
 Railway stations in Venezuela
 Gustavo Dudamel

References

External links 

 LaraTurismo, WebGuide of Tourism in Lara
 Barquisimeto.com
 MiBarquisimeto, Dedicado a Barquisimeto
 Check the weather in Barquisimeto now
 Nuevo Sistema Ferroviario de Venezuela
 Video Footage of Barquisimeto and some of its places
 Barquisimeto, Bitacora de una Ciudad
 Venezuela Tuya, Barquisimeto
 Discover Venezuela, Barquisimeto
  Museo de Barquisimeto

 
Populated places established in 1552
1552 establishments in the Spanish Empire